Dendragonum is a genus of beetles in the family Carabidae, containing the following species:

 Dendragonum gerardi Burgeon, 1933
 Dendragonum leroyi Basilewsky, 1949
 Dendragonum pallidum Burgeon, 1933
 Dendragonum schoutedeni Basilewsky, 1950
 Dendragonum nyakagerae (Basilewsky, 1975)
 Dendragonum paarmanni (Basilewsky, 1975)

References

Platyninae